The Great Piggy Bank Robbery is a 1946 Warner Bros. Looney Tunes theatrical cartoon directed by Bob Clampett. The cartoon was released on July 20, 1946, and stars Daffy Duck.

The short is Clampett's penultimate Warner cartoon, produced shortly before he left the studio.

Plot
On a farm, Daffy awaits his new Dick Tracy comic book to the tune of Raymond Scott's song "Powerhouse". The mailman then arrives, delivering the comic book. To the tune of Franz von Suppé's Poet and Peasant overture, he sprints to a corner of the farm and begins reading it, noting how much he "love(s) that man!." At one point in this issue, Dick Tracy is fighting Noodlenose. Imagining what it would be like to be Dick Tracy, he knocks himself out with his own fist.

While unconscious, he dreams that he is "Duck Twacy, the famous de-tec-a-tive." He dismisses a series of calls asking about stolen piggy banks as too inconsequential for him, suggesting that the callers had been too reckless, until he finds that his own piggy bank has been stolen from his safe. He decides to call Duck Twacy (at one point having a phone conversation with himself) before he realizes that he himself is Duck Twacy. He calls a taxi to follow a car without him, just to keep the villains on their toes.

Daffy's search leads him to cross paths with Sherlock Holmes, then onto a streetcar (driven by a mustachioed Porky Pig in a silent cameo) leading to the gangsters' not-so-secret hideout. He falls through a trapdoor when he rings the doorbell, and follows footprints, even climbing up a wall (which makes him think that the culprit might be the Human Fly) to a mousehole. He concludes that the culprit is "Mouse Man," demanding, "Come out of there, you rat!"—whereupon a huge, muscular, and angry mouse emerges, and towers over him. Gulping in fear, Daffy timidly tells him to go back in again, and so he does. He runs away, but is surrounded by all the dangerous criminals in town (many of which are parodies of Dick Tracy's rogues gallery), and consisting of:

 Snake Eyes – Spoof of B.B. Eyes, who has dice for eyes.
 88 Teeth – Spoof of 88 Keys, with piano keys for teeth.
 Hammerhead – A gangster with a hammer for a head.
 Pussycat Puss – A cat gangster who bears some resemblance to Sylvester.
 Bat Man – An anthropomorphic baseball bat who is a name parody of the comics character Batman.
 Doubleheader – A two-headed baseball player spoof of Tulza "Haf and Haf" Tuzon.
 Pickle Puss – A pickle spoof of Pruneface.
 Pumpkinhead – A gangster with a jack-o'-lantern for a head.
 Neon Noodle – A neon figure that resembles Frankenstein's monster.
 Jukebox Jaw – A criminal with a jukebox speaker for a jaw and a turntable on top of his head.
 Wolf Man – A wolf gangster.
 Rubberhead – A pencil eraser-headed gangster.
...and a host of other unnamed grotesque criminals.

He then, with a certain lack of tactical sense declares "You're all under arrest!" The villains then roar at Daffy and the chase begins. In one sequence, the villains are seen using well-known Dick Tracy villain Flattop's head as an airstrip with planes taking off. When Daffy is trapped against a wall, Rubberhead "rubs him out" with his eraser head, but Daffy immediately reappears. Pumpkinhead moves in with submachine guns blazing. Daffy tosses a hand grenade directly to Pumpkinhead and he becomes a stack of pumpkin pies.

As most of the villains jump to trap him in a closet, Daffy squirms out, slams the door shut on them, and eradicates the group with sustained fire from a Tommy gun. He opens the door, and the bullet-riddled bodies fall like dominoes. Neon Noodle (who survived because he is a mere neon outline with no physical "center" for Daffy to shoot) sneaks up on Daffy and tries to strangle him. Daffy defeats him by turning him into a neon sign that reads "Eat at Joe's" (a standard WB cartoon gag).

Daffy then finds the missing piggy banks, including his own. He begins to kiss his bank but, since he is dreaming, he does not realize that he is on the farm again, kissing a real female pig. The plump and curvaceous pig is rather smitten by Daffy since she believes that he is trying to woo her with the barrage of smooches which he plants all over her face. He wraps up his kisses with a peck to the cute pig's nose. In an elegant female voice, she asks, "Shall we dance?" and lovingly kisses him right on the mouth. Now wide awake, Daffy disgustedly wipes away the kiss and runs away. The lady pig then remarks, "I love that duck!," and laughs.

Reception
Animation historian Steve Schneider writes, "Banners and bouquets to the great Bob C. for this still-astonishing melange of ultra-silliness and film noir. He creates a realm where stylizations feed into the fugue states so beloved of the director, where animation's capacity for compressing and distending space and time (and bodies!) is stunningly realized, where terror and hilarity are shown to be natural bedmates, and where the whacked-out visions come so fast and thick that the thing seems to anticipate MTV by forty years."

Allusions and influence
 The opening where Daffy waits for the mail and gets his comic book, lies down on the ground and says, "I can't wait to see what happens to Dick Tracy!" is a reused gag from Clampett's Farm Frolics.
 Daffy's early line about Dick Tracy, "I love that man!" and the pig's closing line, "I love that duck!" are references to a popular catch-phrase of the time, "Love dat man!", said by the character Beulah on Fibber McGee and Molly. Clampett would use the gag again in his next and final cartoon at Warner Bros., The Big Snooze.
 A sequel, The Night of the Living Duck, would follow in 1988, with Daffy reading a fictional horror/science-fiction comic Hideous Tales in that film. Pumpkinhead also makes a cameo in that film.
 The gag where Duck Twacy says "I'm gonna pin it on ya," only to be revealed to be playing pin the tail on the donkey, is taken from the Tex Avery cartoon Thugs with Dirty Mugs.
 In the Tiny Toon Adventures episode "New Character Day", there was a segment called "The Return of Pluck Twacy" where Plucky Duck is in that homages this cartoon. Here, Pluck Twacy had to rescue Shirley the Loon's aura (who is really Hatta Mari) from gangsters like Ticklepuss (based on Sloppy Moe from Wagon Heels), Soupy Man (an anthropomorphic soup can), Jack the Zipper (an anthropomorphic zipper), Boston Dangler (an upside-down Bostonian on a trapeze), Flatbottom (a naval criminal with a miniature battleship for a butt), Boxcars (a train conductor based on the Peter Lorre scientist), the Generic Thugs, Wolvertoon (a deformed version of Bugs Bunny in a homage to Basil Wolverton's drawings), Millipede Pete (an anthropomorphic millipede), the Chorus Line Men, and the other unnamed grotesque criminals.
 Daffy says "sufferin' succotash" while waiting for his Dick Tracy comic. This line would eventually become the catchphrase of Sylvester, who also speaks with a lisp. Daffy has said this line in Ain't That Ducky, Baby Bottleneck and Hollywood Daffy, and repeats it in six more cartoons: The Up-Standing Sitter, You Were Never Duckier, Daffy Dilly, His Bitter Half, Fiesta Fiasco and Skyscraper Caper.
 In the scene in which Daffy is seen through a door in silhouette as Duck Twacy, he briefly morphs into Dick Tracy's trademark profile.
 After Daffy shoots through the door with his Tommy gun and the rogues' gallery of characters begin falling, there is a brief shot of a well-endowed woman falling among them.
 An episode of Batman: The Brave and the Bold titled "Legends of the Dark Mite" contains a sequence which heavily parodies the cartoon. Unlike when Daffy faces criminals which are parodies, here Bat-Mite faces actual Batman villains (namely Joker, Penguin, Riddler, Catwoman, Two-Face, Mr. Freeze, Mad Hatter, Catman, Polka-Dot Man, Tweedledum and Tweedledee, Killer Moth, Kite Man, Zebra-Man, and Tiger Shark). As an example, miniature Kite Man figures launch off the top hat of the Mad Hatter.

Legacy
Animation historian Steve Schneider said of this picture:

Animator John Kricfalusi (creator of Ren and Stimpy) called The Great Piggy Bank Robbery his favorite cartoon: "I saw this thing and it completely changed my life, I thought it was the greatest thing I'd ever seen, and I still think it is."

The Great Piggy Bank Robbery was the first of several cartoons in which Daffy Duck would do a parody of a well-known character, but the only one in which he was actually competent.  In other take-offs, such as The Scarlet Pumpernickel, he was somewhat buffoonish, though still able to intimidate the villains.  But, in later stories such as Stuporduck, Boston Quackie, Robin Hood Daffy and Deduce, You Say? (in which he played "Doorlock Holmes"), Daffy was hopelessly outmatched.

In 1994, it was voted No. 16 of the 50 Greatest Cartoons of all time by members of the animation field.

See also
Looney Tunes and Merrie Melodies filmography (1940–1949)

References

External links
 
 

Looney Tunes shorts
Films directed by Bob Clampett
1946 animated films
1946 films
1940s Warner Bros. animated short films
Daffy Duck films
Porky Pig films
1940s police comedy films
1940s parody films
American police detective films
Dick Tracy
Sherlock Holmes pastiches
1940s crime comedy films
1946 short films
1940s police procedural films
1940s English-language films
Films about dreams
Films about comics
Films set on farms